Evergreen is an unincorporated community in Gallia County, in the U.S. state of Ohio.

History
Evergreen was platted in 1855. A post office called Evergreen was established in 1880, and remained in operation until 1927.

References

Unincorporated communities in Gallia County, Ohio
Unincorporated communities in Ohio